This article shows all participating team squads at the 2008 Women's European Water Polo Championship.

Source

Source

Source

Source

Source

Source



Source

References

Women
Women's European Water Polo Championship
European Water Polo Championship squads
Euro